Limes may refer to:
 the plural form of lime (disambiguation)
 the Latin word for limit which refers to:
 Limes (Roman Empire), a border marking and defense system of the ancient Roman Empire
 Limes (magazine), an Italian geopolitical magazine

See also